1st Lithuanian National Cavalry Brigade, also known as Hussar or Kaunas Brigade was an 18th-century National Cavalry Brigade of the Grand Ducal Lithuanian Army. It was formed in 1776.

This regiment was garrisoned at Kaunas, Minskas (1789), Kėdainiai (1790), Vilkmergė, Panevėžys, Raseiniai, and Šiauliai. In the War of 1792, the unit fought in the battles of Naujieji Sveržanai (10 June 1792), Mir (June 11) and Joniškėlis. In the Uprising of 1794, the 1st Lithuanian National Brigade fought in the battles of Lithuanian Brest (23 July 1794), Shchuchyn (May 13), Panevėžys (?) (May 20), and Skuodas (before July 12).

Commanders 

 , Lieutenant general (died in 1778)
 , General major (3 December 1778)
 Szymon Zabiełło (26 June 1788)
 Mikołaj Sulistrowski (1791)
 Frankovskis (1792)

References 
 

Military units and formations established in 1776
Lithuanian National Cavalry Brigades